Chukar may refer to:
Chukar partridge (Alectoris chukar), a Eurasian upland gamebird in the pheasant family Phasianidae
Chukar (rural locality), a rural locality (a selo) in Nyurbinsky District of the Sakha Republic, Russia
Northrop BQM-74 Chukar, a series of aerial target drones
Chukar Entertainment, a student organization in Treasure Valley Community College, a community college in Ontario, Oregon, U.S.A.

See also
Chukar Cherries, a Pacific Northwest food brand
Idaho Falls Chukars, a minor-league affiliate of the Kansas City Royals baseball team
Reno Chukars, name of Marysville Gold Sox, a US summer collegiate wood-bat club from California, in 1996–1998